Get Some is the debut studio album by American heavy metal band Snot. Released in 1997, it is the only album that features the band's original vocalist, Lynn Strait, who was killed in a car accident in December 1998 when a truck struck his car, killing him and his boxer Dobbs, who appears on the album cover.

Release and reception
The album was released on May 27, 1997, exactly two years after the May 27, 1995 formation of Snot. Guitarist Sonny Mayo later recalled that Dobbs (featured on the cover) also had a litter of puppies the day the album came out.

Australian publication Tone Deaf reflected in 2015 that, "when Snot released their debut album Get Some in 1997 it was heralded as one of the most melodic, groove laden offerings of [the] nu metal scene. Full on massive punk riffs and killer heavy funk grooves, the album found immediate critical favor and won the band a legion of dedicated Snot Heads, in the process helping to fuel the founding fire of a new musical movement that was to sweep the globe."

In 2022, Revolver featured Get Some on a list of "Top 5 One-Album Wonders", and labelled the music as a mix of "Red Hot Chili Peppers-esque funk-rock with sprinting hardcore thrashers and rambunctious Bizkit-ian rap-metal."

Track listing
"Snot" – 3:23
"Stoopid" – 3:53
"Joy Ride" – 2:26
"The Box" – 3:25
"Snooze Button" – 4:17
"313" – 2:25
"Get Some" – 4:56
"Deadfall" – 2:19
"I Jus' Lie" – 3:34
"Get Some O' Deez" – 0:58
"Unplugged" – 4:11
"Tecato" – 4:30
"Mr. Brett" (feat. Theo Kogan) – 2:13
"Get Some Keez" – 2:46
"My Balls" – 2:58

Personnel
Mike Doling – guitar
John Fahnestock – bass
Jamie Miller – drums
Lynn Strait – vocals
Sonny Mayo – guitar
T-Ray – producer
Dave Fortman – guitar on "Deadfall"
Glenn Nelson – banjo on "Deadfall"

References

1997 debut albums
Funk metal albums
Geffen Records albums
Snot (band) albums